is a Japanese guidebook series written by Mitsuba and published by Ichijinsha. The series is aimed at men in their 30s who have not had any romantic or sexual relationships with women. It includes colourful characters and some laughs.  The manga adaptation by Rikako Inomoto started on the November/December 2010 issue of Comic Rex. In 2011, the book was adapted into an anime television series produced by Gathering and was broadcast in Japan on BS11 and Tokyo MX from April to June 2011.

Media

Guidebooks 
The first book was published in November 2008 and was followed by three sequels.

Manga

Anime

Synopsis

Characters 

Hayao is a 30-Year-old salaryman who has yet to lose his virginity. Due to his lack of personal skills he is resigned to using a blow-up wife to release his sexual tension. Hayao is the subject of Daigorō and Macaron's mission.

Natsu is a 30-Year-old Librarian who has yet to lose her virginity. She is timid and extends her A.K. Field to keep away others. Natsu, like Hayao, has Gods staying with her to help her with relationships and lose her virginity. When she meets Hayao properly she rejects him out of fear; however, with Pī-chan's help and Hayao's determination, she overcomes her fear.

Daigorō is a God of Sexual Love sent from heaven in order to help Hayao meet women and lose his virginity. Some of his methods are a little unorthodox. He usually dresses in a long old-fashioned green coat and white breeches.

Macaron is Daigorō's little brother. His normal-wear is the same as that of his brother's, although he wears a waistcoat rather than a long coat. He likes drinking and dressing up in women's clothes; for this reason, he is often used as the practice doll for teaching Hayao.

Pī-chan and her twin sister Kū-chan are Gods of Sexual Love sent from heaven to help Natsu build relationships, fall in love and lose her virginity, they dress in the Gothic Lolita fashion; Pī-chan is the smarter and more pro-active of the sisters. She's had a run-in with Daigorō before as he liked flipping her skirt in elementary school, but also has a crush on Daigoro

Kū-chan and her twin sister Pī-chan are Gods of Sexual Love sent from heaven to help Natsu build relationships, fall in love and lose her virginity, they dress in the Gothic Lolita fashion; Kū-chan likes eating and drinking weird and often very spicy things such as Peppercorns and Tabasco. She helps her sister, but most of the time seems very dumb and makes life difficult for her sister. When she does do something on her own initiative, she is much more effective then her sister.

Episode list

Reception 
The anime's censorship on TV was reviewed by Japanator as excessive, to the point that not only sexual gags were censored, but that text and the title of a segment was censored.

References

External links 
  
  

2008 Japanese novels
2011 Japanese television series endings
Ichijinsha manga
Shōnen manga
Television shows based on books